is a professional Japanese baseball player. He plays pitcher for the Yokohama DeNA BayStars.

Career
Mikami signed with the Canberra Cavalry of the Australian Baseball League to play weeks 3-10 of the 2018/19 ABL season.

On February 27, 2019, he was selected for Japan national baseball team at the 2019 exhibition games against Mexico.

References

External links

 NPB.com

1989 births
Living people
Canberra Cavalry players
Nippon Professional Baseball pitchers
Baseball people from Gifu Prefecture
Yokohama DeNA BayStars players
Japanese expatriate baseball players in Australia